Mónika Dunai (born September 21, 1966, in Budapest) is a Hungarian-French teacher and politician. She is a member of National Assembly of Hungary (Országgyűlés) since 2014. In the 2014 and 2018 parliamentary elections, she was elected a Member of Parliament in the Budapest 14th constituency (10th and 17th districts) as a candidate for the Fidesz.

References 

Living people
1966 births
People from Budapest
Hungarian politicians
21st-century Hungarian politicians
Fidesz politicians
Members of the National Assembly of Hungary (2014–2018)
Members of the National Assembly of Hungary (2018–2022)
Members of the National Assembly of Hungary (2022–2026)
Women members of the National Assembly of Hungary